Endosimilis is a monotypic snout moth genus described by Paul Ernest Sutton Whalley in 1961. Its only species, E. stilbealis, was described by Francis Walker in 1859. It is found in Australia.

References

Endotrichini
Monotypic moth genera
Moths of Australia
Pyralidae genera